Sir Anthony Fell (18 May 1914 – 20 March 1998) was a British Conservative Party politician. He sat in the House of Commons for most of the years from 1951 to 1983.

Early life
He was educated in New Zealand and at Bedford School.

Political career
Fell first stood for Parliament in a by-election for the seat of Brigg in 1948, but was defeated by Labour's Lance Mallalieu. He stood in another by-election a year later for Hammersmith South, but was beaten by Thomas Williams, as he was in the 1950 General Election.

He was elected at the 1951 general election as Member of Parliament (MP) for Great Yarmouth, a seat which had been held at the start of the 20th century by his grandfather Sir Arthur Fell.  Yarmouth returned him to the Commons at three further elections.  At the 1966 general election, Labour's Hugh Gray won the seat, with a majority of 797.

Fell regained the seat at the 1970 general election, with a majority of over 3,000, and retained it through three further elections until he retired, aged 69, at the 1983 general election. He was knighted in 1982. His successor was Michael Carttiss, another Conservative.

Fell was a member of the Conservative Monday Club.

References

External links 
 

Conservative Party (UK) MPs for English constituencies
UK MPs 1951–1955
UK MPs 1955–1959
UK MPs 1959–1964
UK MPs 1964–1966
UK MPs 1970–1974
UK MPs 1974
UK MPs 1974–1979
UK MPs 1979–1983
People educated at Bedford School
1914 births
1998 deaths
Knights Bachelor
Politics of the Borough of Great Yarmouth
Politicians awarded knighthoods